Bård Ludvig Thorheim (born 15 October 1976) is a Norwegian politician.

He was elected representative to the Storting from the constituency of Nordland for the period 2021–2025, for the Conservative Party.

References

1976 births
Living people
Conservative Party (Norway) politicians
Nordland politicians
Members of the Storting